Maylandia lanisticola is a species of cichlid endemic to Lake Malawi. It can also be found in the aquarium trade. This species is alternatively classified in the genus Pseudotropheus.

References

lanisticola
Fish of Lake Malawi
Fish of Malawi
Fish described in 1976
Taxobox binomials not recognized by IUCN
Taxonomy articles created by Polbot